Pickering Transit was a Canadian public transit operator in the City of Pickering, Ontario.

History
Transit service in Pickering began with the Bay Ridges Dial-A-Bus, which ran from July 1970 to January 1973 as a demonstration project conducted by the Government of Ontario.  Local GO fixed route supplementary service was introduced in February 1972.

Transit service was taken over by the municipality with the creation of Pickering Transit in 1973.

Pickering Transit and Ajax Transit were merged on September 4, 2001 to form the Ajax Pickering Transit Authority.  APTA was merged into Durham Region Transit on January 1, 2006. DRT's Pickering operations remain heavily based on those operated by Pickering Transit.

Routes

The following routes were operated:

 Industrial
 Liverpool
 Town Centre
 Amberlea
 Glendale
 West Shore
 Bay Ridges
 Rosebank
 Ajax
 Finch/Hwy 2
 Brock Rd
 Maple Ridge
 Highbush

References

Transit agencies in Ontario
Transport in Pickering, Ontario
History of transport in the Regional Municipality of Durham